Daniel "Danny" Owens is an Irish retired hurler who played as a midfielder for the Offaly senior team.

Born in Killoughey, County Offaly, Owens first played competitive hurling in his youth. He made his senior debut with Offaly during the 1980-81 National League and immediately became a regular member of the team. During his career Owens won two All-Ireland medals, five Leinster medals and one National Hurling League medal.

At club level Owens played with Kilcormac–Killoughey.

Throughout his career Owens made 25 championship appearances. His retirement came following the conclusion of the 1992 championship.

In retirement from playing Owens became involved in team management and coaching. He is the current manager of Kilcormac–Killoughey and has guided the team to one Leinster and three championship titles.

Honours

Player

Offaly
All-Ireland Senior Hurling Championship (2): 1981, 1985
Leinster Senior Hurling Championship (5): 1981, 1985, 1988, 1989, 1990
National Hurling League (1): 1990-91

Manager

Kilcormac–Killoughey
Leinster Senior Club Hurling Championship (1): 2012
Offaly Senior Club Hurling Championship (2): 2012, 2013, 2014

References

Living people
Kilcormac-Killoughey hurlers
Offaly inter-county hurlers
Hurling managers
All-Ireland Senior Hurling Championship winners
Year of birth missing (living people)